Zieglericonus is an extinct genus of Late Triassic (Rhaetian-age) conodonts, with a simple conical form.

References 

Triassic conodonts
Conodont genera